The Landis Taipei is a five-star luxury hotel located in Zhongshan District, Taipei, Taiwan. Opened in 1979, the hotel has 209 rooms and suites and has facilities such as a 24-hour business center, rooftop fitness center, and Proust VIP lounge. The Landis Taipei has received many distinguished guests in the past, including The Three Tenors.

Restaurants
Tien Hsiang Lo: A Zhejiang restaurant located on floor B1 serving Hangzhou’s traditional dishes, such as drunken chicken.
La Brasserie and Le Rendez-Vous: A French restaurant serving provincial specialties and cocktails.
Paris1930 de Hideki Takayama: French restaurant.
Liz Gastronomie: A pastry shop offering a variety of breads, cakes, pastries and desserts.

Public transportation

Taipei Metro
 Zhonghe–Xinlu line
 Zhongshan Elementary School metro station

Gallery

See also
 Shangri-La Far Eastern, Taipei
 Mandarin Oriental, Taipei
 Hotel Metropolitan Premier Taipei

References

External links

 The Landis Taipei Hotel official site

Hotel buildings completed in 1979
1979 establishments in Taiwan
Hotels established in 1979
Hotels in Taipei